Valdez Is Coming is a 1971 American Western film directed by Edwin Sherin and starring Burt Lancaster, Susan Clark, Richard Jordan and Jon Cypher. The film is based on the 1970 Elmore Leonard novel of the same name.

Plot
Aging town constable Bob Valdez (Burt Lancaster) is tricked into killing an innocent African-American man by powerful rancher Frank Tanner (Jon Cypher), whose hired gun R.L. Davis (Richard Jordan) shot up the hovel where the wrongly accused man and his Indian wife were trapped. Valdez believes it would be a fair gesture to raise $200 for the widow, $100 from Tanner and the rest from others in town.

Tanner is livid at the old man's suggestion. He orders ranch hand El Segundo (Barton Heyman) and his men to tie Valdez to a heavy wooden cross and drive him into the desert. The central pole is so long that Valdez must walk bent over. He finds an oasis blocked by two trees that he repeatedly tries to ram with the ends of the cross. When it finally breaks, the jagged ends are driven into Valdez's back.

Davis finds him and cuts the ropes, freeing the unconscious man. The badly injured Valdez is able to crawl to the ranch of his friend Diego (Frank Silvera), where he is nursed back to health. Unfortunately for Tanner, he has picked on the wrong man: Valdez is a wily, experienced Indian fighter and a marksman with a rifle. He dons his old cavalry uniform and sends Tanner a message via one of the rancher's wounded men (Héctor Elizondo): "Valdez is coming."

Valdez sneaks into the compound and, during the ensuing gun battle and his escape, kidnaps Tanner's woman, Gay Erin (Susan Clark), for whose favors it is rumored that Tanner had her husband killed. With her in restraints, Valdez proceeds to systematically do away with the men Tanner sends after him with his long-range Sharps rifle. The only one he shows mercy to is Davis, after the gunman screams, "I cut you loose! I cut you loose!" and reveals that the cut on the left wrist of Valdez concealed under his glove came when his knife slipped as he cut the ropes off.

Now he has two hostages. While hiding from Tanner's posse, Valdez realizes that Gay Erin knows who killed her husband. Valdez confronts her and she admits that it was she who killed her own husband in order to be with Tanner, not the other way around. He sets her free, but by now Tanner's woman is sympathetic to his cause, feeling guilty because she was the cause of all the deaths so far.

Despite Gay Erin's help, Valdez is finally surrounded and captured. Tanner and his men ride up. The men are ordered to shoot, but R.L. Davis backs off, showing he has no gun, and El Segundo calls his men aside, refusing to obey orders. That leaves Tanner to do his own dirty work—if he can.

Tanner turns out to be a coward one-on-one. Gay makes it clear she will not return to Tanner. Tanner helplessly snarls at Valdez, "I should have had you killed three days ago." He calmly replies, "Or paid the $100."

Cast
 Burt Lancaster as Constable Bob Valdez
 Susan Clark as Gay Erin
 Jon Cypher as Frank Tanner
 Frank Silvera as Diego
 Héctor Elizondo as Mexican Rider 
 Phil Brown as Malson
 Richard Jordan as R.L. Davis
 Barton Heyman as "El Segundo" 
 Ralph Brown as Beaudry
 Werner Hasselmann as Sheriff
 Lex Monson as Rincon
 Sylvia Poggioli as Segundo's Girl
 José García García as Carlos
 María Montez as Anita
 Juanita Penaloza as Indian Woman

Production
The film was filmed in southern Spain in locales used by Italian filmmaker Sergio Leone in his European "spaghetti" Westerns. The desert-like terrain of this isolated region of Spain resembles the U.S. southwest and parts of Sonora, Mexico, though the vegetation is not the same.

When director Sydney Pollack was attached to the property, Lancaster was originally slated to play Frank Tanner with Marlon Brando as Valdez. These plans failed to materialize when Lancaster got involved in the 1970 movie Airport.

Reception
The film received primarily mediocre to negative reviews. Vincent Canby of The New York Times praised Lancaster's on-screen presence but wrote that, "A lot of fancy flourishes, which I associate with Mr. Sherin's stage work, are apparent in the film, as in its picturesque groupings of picturesque characters, and in a musical score that's much given to comment on the action."  Canby's description of the plot is illuminating as to the impact the movie probably made when it came out.  "Within the first half-hour of the movie, Bob Valdez (Lancaster) is humiliated, called a greaser, shot at and mock-crucified, all because he wants to raise $200 from the white men responsible (along with himself) for the killing of a black freed-man, a murder-suspect later known to have been innocent. The money is to go to the black man's pregnant Apache woman.  This bare description of the plot will give you some idea of the film's very contemporary racial sensibilities, which though honorable, are simply the décor of a harmless Western. On second thought, perhaps, it's not quite that harmless. The humiliations suffered by Valdez early on, as well as the ruthlessness of the villains, are of such unequivocal nastiness that the film's ultimate satisfactions come not from the triumph of honor, but from the scope of the revenge."

When the film was released to video, Ty Burr of Entertainment Weekly wrote that, "Slow and choppy, Valdez manages an astounding feat: It drains Lancaster of personality."

References

External links
 
 
 
 

1971 films
1971 Western (genre) films
American Western (genre) films
Films based on American novels
Films based on works by Elmore Leonard
Films based on Western (genre) novels
Films set in the 1880s
United Artists films
Films shot in Almería
Films produced by Burt Lancaster
1970s English-language films
1970s American films